Vitalie Railean (born 23 August 1975) is a Moldovan wrestler. He was born in Criuleni. He placed sixth in Freestyle wrestling, light flyweight class, at the 1996 Summer Olympics in Atlanta. He placed seventh in the bantamweight class at the 2000 Summer Olympics in Sydney.

References

External links

1975 births
Living people
Olympic wrestlers of Moldova
Wrestlers at the 1996 Summer Olympics
Wrestlers at the 2000 Summer Olympics
Moldovan male sport wrestlers
People from Criuleni District
20th-century Moldovan people
21st-century Moldovan people